Vexillum aureolatum, common name : the golden mitre, is a species of small sea snail, marine gastropod mollusk in the family Costellariidae, the ribbed miters.

Description
The shell size varies between 8 mm and 29 mm

The shell is orange-brown, with a small white superior zone, and sometimes one or more thread-like inferior bands;
sometimes white with an orange band below the suture and another at the base.

Distribution
This species occurs in the Red Sea and in the Indian Ocean off Madagascar and Mauritius and in the tropical Indo-Pacific from the Gulf of Oman to Polynesia, Fiji and Hawaii

References

 Dautzenberg, Ph. (1929). Mollusques testacés marins de Madagascar. Faune des Colonies Francaises, Tome III
 Vine, P. (1986). Red Sea Invertebrates. Immel Publishing, London. 224 pp
 Michel, C. (1988). Marine molluscs of Mauritius. Editions de l'Ocean Indien. Stanley, Rose Hill. Mauritius
 Turner H. 2001. Katalog der Familie Costellariidae Macdonald, 1860. Conchbooks. 1–100 page(s): 18

External links
 Reeve, L. A. (1844-1845). Monograph of the genus Mitra. In: Conchologia Iconica, or, illustrations of the shells of molluscous animals, vol. 2, pl. 1-39 and unpaginated text. L. Reeve & Co., London.
  Liénard, Élizé. Catalogue de la faune malacologique de l'île Maurice et de ses dépendances comprenant les îles Seychelles, le groupe de Chagos composé de Diego-Garcia, Six-îles, Pèros-Banhos, Salomon, etc., l'île Rodrigues, l'île de Cargados ou Saint-Brandon. J. Tremblay, 1877.
 Cernohorsky W.O. (1978) New species of Mitridae, Costellariidae, and Turridae from the Hawaiian Islands with notes in Mitra sphoni in the Galapagos Islands. The Nautilus 92(3): 61–67. 
 W.O.Cernohorsky, The Mitridae of Fiji - The Veliger v. 8 (1965-1966)

aureolatum
Gastropods described in 1844